The Lou Gehrig Memorial Award is given annually to a Major League Baseball (MLB) player who best exhibits the character and integrity of Lou Gehrig, both on the field and off it. The award was created by the Phi Delta Theta fraternity in honor of Gehrig, who was a member of the fraternity at Columbia University. The award's purpose is to recognize a player's exemplary contributions in "both his community and philanthropy." The bestowal of the award is overseen by the headquarters of the Phi Delta Theta in Oxford, Ohio, and the name of each winner is inscribed onto the Lou Gehrig Award plaque in the Baseball Hall of Fame in Cooperstown, New York. It is the only MLB award conferred by a fraternity.

Twenty-eight winners of the Lou Gehrig Memorial Award are members of the National Baseball Hall of Fame.  The inaugural winner was Alvin Dark. Curt Schilling (1995) and Shane Victorino (2008) received the award for working with the ALS Association and raising money for amyotrophic lateral sclerosis (ALS). The disease took Gehrig's life and is eponymously known as "Lou Gehrig's disease".  Mike Timlin won the award in 2007 for his efforts in raising awareness and finding a cure for ALS, which took his mother's life in 2002.

Winners of the Lou Gehrig Memorial Award have undertaken a variety of different causes. Many winners, including Rick Sutcliffe, Barry Larkin, Mark McGwire, Todd Stottlemyre and Derek Jeter, worked with children in need. Jeter assisted children and teenagers in avoiding drug and alcohol addiction through his Turn 2 Foundation, while Sutcliffe visited disabled children in hospitals and bestowed college scholarships to underprivileged juveniles through his foundation.  Other winners devoted their work to aiding individuals who had a specific illness, such as Albert Pujols, whose daughter suffers from Down syndrome, and who devoted the Pujols Family Foundation to helping those with the disorder, and Ryan Zimmerman, who established the ziMS Foundation to raise money for multiple sclerosis, the disease which afflicts his mother.

Winners

See also

Roberto Clemente Award
Players Choice Awards (The Marvin Miller Man of the Year Award)
Branch Rickey Award
Baseball awards
List of Major League Baseball awards

References
GeneralSpecific

Major League Baseball trophies and awards
Sportsmanship trophies and awards
Phi Delta Theta
Amyotrophic lateral sclerosis
Awards established in 1955
1955 establishments in the United States